Smalley is a surname. Notable people with the surname include:

 Adam Smalley, British Racing Driver
 Beryl Smalley, historian
 Bill Smalley, British footballer
 Dave Smalley, musician
 Dave Smalley (Cleveland), musician
 David Allen Smalley, democrat
 Denis Smalley, musician
 Eugene Byron Smalley plant pathologist
 Gary Smalley, counselor
 Hal Smalley, politician
 Kyle E. Smalley, astronomer
 Luke Smalley (1955–2009), American photographer
 Phillips Smalley, film director
 Richard Smalley, Nobel prize in chemistry 1996
 Roger Smalley (1943–2015), musician
 Roy Smalley Jr., baseball player
 Roy Smalley III, baseball player
 Sherman E. Smalley (1866-1958), American politician and jurist
 Stuart Smalley, fictional character
 Timothy E. Smalley, philanthropist
 Tom Smalley (1912–1984), England international footballer
 Will Smalley, American baseball player
 William A. Smalley (1923–1997), linguist
 William E. Smalley, American bishop